The Snake River sucker (''Chasmistes muriei') is an extinct species of ray-finned fish in the family Catostomidae.

It was endemic to the Snake River below Jackson Lake Dam in Wyoming. It is now presumed to be an extinct species.

See also

References

External links

Catostomidae
Extinct animals of the United States
Fish of the Western United States
Freshwater fish of the United States
Natural history of Wyoming
Snake River
Fish described in 1981
Fish of North America becoming extinct since 1500
Taxonomy articles created by Polbot